Inès Lamunière (1954) is a Swiss architect and professor.

Early life and education
Lamunière was born in Geneva, Switzerland, in 1954. After studying architecture at EPFL (École Polytechnique Fédérale de Lausanne), where she graduated in 1980, she continued her training in architectural theory and history as a member of the Swiss Institute in Rome.

Academic career

Lamunière became an assistant lecturer at the ETHZ (Eidgenössische Technische Hochschule Zürich) under Professor Werner Oechslin.

In 1991 she was appointed as adjunct professor, Design Studio Master I-III at ETH Zurich and in 1994, as full professor in Architecture and Design at EPFL. In parallel to her teaching and since 2001, she set up the research team and laboratory (EPFL LAMU) of which she is head.  Inès Lamunière was chair of the Department of Architecture at EPFL from 2008 to 2011.

She co-edited the Geneva-based architecture journal Faces –Journal d’architectures from 1989 to 2004. In 1996, 1999 and 2008 she was Visiting Professor at the Graduate School of Design, Harvard University.

Career in architecture
Lamunière is founder and head of dl-a designlab-architecture SA, a Geneva-based architectural practice, which designs modern, sustainable buildings. Recent projects of the firm include the newly completed Lausanne Opera House, which she designed with fellow architect Patrick Devanthéry. Her projects and buildings have been exhibited (most recently in Paris in 2010) and widely published.

Prize 

Inès Lamunière received the Swiss Meret Oppenheim award for the arts in 2011.

Publications
Main publications in architectural Design:
 
Joseph Abram, Devanthéry & Lamunière, Fo(u)r Example(s), Birkhäuser-Verlag, Basel, 1996.
Joseph Abram, Devanthéry & Lamunière, Pathfinders, Birkhäuser-Verlag, Basel, 2005.
Emmanuel Caille et al., Devanthéry & Lamunière, InDetails,  Archibooks Sautereau Ed, Paris, 2010.
Anne Kockelkorn and Laurent Stalder, Devanthéry – Lamunière : images d’architecture – Deux entretiens, Editions Infolio, Gollion, 2011.

Main publications in Research 

Inès Lamuniere, et al., “Le Corbusier : la construction de l'immeuble Clarté à Genève”, Cataloghi dell'Accademia *di Architettura, Gustavo Gili, Mendrisio/Milano, 1999.
Inès Lamuniere, Fo(u)r cities, PPUR, Lausanne, 2005.
Inès Lamuniere, Habiter la menace, PPUR, Lausanne, 2006.
Inès Lamuniere, Green and Grey, Urban and Natural, GSD Harvard et EPFL, Cambridge et Lausanne, 2009.
Inès Lamuniere, Objets risqués, PPUR, Lausanne, 2015.

References

External links 
https://www.dl-a.ch
http://people.epfl.ch/ines.lamuniere?lang=fr (in French)

Living people
1954 births
Swiss women architects
Swiss women writers
Architects from Geneva